Zoltán Kádár (born 4 October 1966) is a former Romanian international footballer of Hungarian ethnicity. He is currently the assistant coach of BSC Young Boys in the Swiss Super League.

Club career
Zoltán Kádár was born on 4 October 1966 in Ozun, Romania and started to play football at junior level in Brașov for local club Tractorul. In 1984 he went to play at FC Brașov where he won the junior republican championship in 1985 and also made his senior Divizia A debut. In 1987, he enrolled at the Babeș-Bolyai University, subsequently he switched to play for the university's club, Universitatea Cluj.

In 1991 Kádár was signed by Dinamo București on the initiation of the club's president Vasile Ianul for a fee of US$30,000. Kádár spent four years at Dinamo, during this period he helped the club win the 1991–92 Divizia A undefeated, being used by coach Florin Halagian in 29 games in which he scored one goal and also made 14 appearances in European competitions, including appearing in Dinamo's 2–1 victory on aggregate against Luis Figo's Sporting Lisabona in the 1991–92 UEFA Cup.

In January 1996, Kádár returned to Universitatea Cluj for a brief period, he eventually retired at the end of the season and opened a restaurant in Gherla. Not much later, however, he was approached by former Dinamo teammate, Gábor Gerstenmájer, who then played in Switzerland to come play for his team, Schaffhausen and Kádár accepted, going to the club where he spent four seasons before in 2000 the club got relegated and he switched to fourth division team Frauenfeld as a player-coach. In his second season in Frauenfeld, the club won promotion to the third division and after he retired from his playing career in 2005 he became a youth coach at Winterthur U18.

International career
Zoltán Kádár played 7 friendly games for Romania, making his debut on 17 April 1991 when coach Mircea Rădulescu sent him on the field in the 87th minute in order to replace Gabi Balint in a 2–0 away victory against Spain. His last game for the national team was on 13 February 1994 in a 2–1 victory against the United States.

Managerial career

Grasshopper Club Zürich
After over six years coaching the Winterthur youth teams, he was hired by Grasshopper Club Zürich as their U18 coach. In the following year, he became the assistant of head coach of the first team, Uli Forte, and helped the club to achieve their first title after ten years, with the 2012–13 Swiss Cup. After Forte's departure, he remained assistant coach for Michael Skibbe (2013-2015), Pierluigi Tami (2015-2017), and Carlos Bernegger (2017). He also took over as interim coach briefly in early 2015, between Skibbe's departure and Tami's appointment.

FC Zürich
In July 2017, he joined city rivals FC Zürich as assistant and forward coach, as well as video analyst, joining up again with Uli Forte. He remained at FC Zürich after Forte's departure in 2018 and continued serving as assistant of incoming manager Ludovic Magnin until April 2019.

Grasshopper Club (second stint)
During the 2018-19 season, Grasshopper were struggling badly and found themselves at the bottom of the league. On 10 April 2019, Kadar was hired to once again assist Uli Forte to mitigate the disaster that was the 2018-19 Grasshopper season. Sadly, the cup winning coaching team could not avoid relegation and accompanied the club to the Swiss Challenge League for the following season. Kadar remained as assistant to incoming manager Goran Djuricin in February 2020. He became interim coach in May 2020 at the tail end of the season, after Djuricin was terminated when promotion became very unlikely. 

For the following season, João Carlos Pereira was appointed as head coach and Kadar become his assistant until November 2020, when he was appointed head of the training of the GC academy. When Grasshoppers were in danger of missing promotion again, Pereira was terminated in May 2021 and Kadar took up the caretaker role for the third time. He successfully led the team to promotion back to the Swiss Super League. 

Despite this success, he returned to managing the GC academy after the end of the season.

Young Boys
On 14 June 2022, he departed Grasshopper to join BSC Young Boys as assistant coach to Raphaël Wicky.

Honours

Player
Dinamo București
Divizia A: 1991–92

Manager
Grasshopper Club Zürich
Swiss Cup: 2012–13 (assistant)
Swiss Challenge League: 2020–21 (caretaker)

References

External links

1966 births
Living people
People from Covasna County
Romanian footballers
Romanian football managers
Romanian sportspeople of Hungarian descent
Liga I players
Liga II players
Romanian expatriate footballers
Expatriate footballers in Switzerland
Romanian expatriate sportspeople in Switzerland
FC Brașov (1936) players
FC Universitatea Cluj players
FC Dinamo București players
FC Schaffhausen players
FC Frauenfeld players
Association football midfielders
Grasshopper Club Zürich managers
Romania international footballers